"Figure It Out" is a song by the rock musician Serj Tankian. The song was released as the lead single from his third solo album  Harakiri.

Reception
Writing for Artist Direct, Rick Florino complemented the opening guitar, stating "[it] slashes intensely as the legend's poetry rises and falls with the inflection of his voice." Iaan Robinson of Crave Online also praised the track and compared it to Tankian's work in System of a Down.

Consequence of Sound reviewer Adam Kivel criticized the line "Why pretend that we don’t know/ that CEOs are the disease?" for "attempting to force issues into the listener's face". Steve Lepore of PopMatters was also less than enthusiastic about the track, calling the talk-singing sections of the song cliche.

Music video
A lyric video was released for the song on May 1, 2012, the same day as the single release. The song's official music video was later released on May 25, and was directed by Ara Soudijian.

Track listing
Australian promo single

American promo single

7" single

European promo single

Chart positions

Personnel
 Serj Tankian – vocals
 Dan Monti – guitar
 Mario Pagliarulo – bass
 Troy Zeigler – drums

References

2012 songs
2012 singles
Serj Tankian songs
Songs written by Serj Tankian
Reprise Records singles